The 1904 Michigan Wolverines football team represented the University of Michigan in the 1904 Western Conference football season. In the team's fourth season under head coach Fielding H. Yost, the Wolverines compiled a perfect 10–0 record and outscored opponents 567–22. The 1904 team was the fourth of Yost's legendary "Point-a-Minute" teams. Michigan's games were of varying length from 22½ minutes to 70 minutes. Over the course of ten games, Michigan played 476 minutes of football and averaged a point scored for every 50.3 seconds played. The team included future College Football Hall of Fame inductee Willie Heston, who scored 20 touchdowns for 100 points that season; touchdowns were worth five points under 1904 rules.

Schedule

Game summaries

Michigan 33, Case 0

Michigan opened the 1904 college football season on October 1 with a 33–0 win over Cleveland's Case School of Applied Science. The game was played in 20-minute halves, and the Wolverines scored 22 points in the first half. Numerous substitutions were made at half-time, and the backup players added 11 points in the second half. Fullback Frank Longman scored three touchdowns in the game, and Willie Heston, Walter Rheinschild, and Joe Curtis scored one touchdown each. Tom Hammond converted three extra point kicks. Heston's touchdown came on a 75-yard run. Case managed only one first down in the game.

The Michigan players appearing in the game were: John Garrels (left end), Joe Curtis (left tackle), Henry Schulte (left guard), Ted Hammond (starting center), Germany Schulz (right guard), Roy Beechler (starting right tackle and substitute at center), Smull (substitute at right tackle), Tom Hammond (starting right end), Harry Patrick (substitute at right end), Fred Norcross (starting quarterback and substitute at right halfback), Walter Becker (substitute at quarterback), Willie Heston (starting left halfback), William Dennison Clark (substitute at left halfback), Ted Stuart (starting right halfback), James DePree (substitute at right halfback), Frank Longman (starting fullback), and Walter Rheinschild (substitute at fullback).

Michigan 48, Ohio Northern 0
In the second game of the 1904 season, Michigan defeated Ohio Northern, 38–0, in a game consisting of halves of 20 and 15 minutes. Willie Heston scored three touchdowns and had runs of 45, 32, 35 and 30 yards.

Michigan 95, Kalamazoo 0
In the third game of the season, Michigan defeated Kalamazoo College, 95–0, in a game consisting of two 20-minute halves. Heston scored six touchdowns and had long touchdown runs of 65, 70, 85 and 65 yards.

Michigan 72, Physicians & Surgeons 0
In the fourth game of the season, Michigan defeated the Physicians & Surgeons team 72–0 in a short mid-week game lasting only 22½ minutes, a 15-minute first half and a 7½ minute second half. Quarterback Fred Norcross scored four touchdowns, and Heston scored three. Norcross had touchdown runs of 67, 35 and 90 yards.

Michigan 31, Ohio State 6
Michigan defeated Ohio State, 31–6, in a game consisting of 30-minute halves in Columbus, Ohio. Heston scored three touchdowns, bringing his season total to 16.

Michigan 72, American Medical School 0
For its sixth game of the season, Michigan played a short mid-week game against the American Medical School. The game consisted of a 20-minute first half and a 3½ minute second half. Right halfback Clark led the scoring with four touchdowns. Weeks scored three touchdowns. Heston was limited to a single touchdown.

Michigan 130, West Virginia 0
The most lopsided score in Michigan football history.  In a game consisting of 25 and 20-minute halves, the Wolverines scored 22 touchdowns and 20 extra points (which would have resulted in a margin of 152-0 under modern scoring rules).  Joe Curtis alone accounted for 49 points with six touchdowns and 19 extra points. The undefeated 1904 team won Michigan's fourth national championship and scored 567 points in 476 minutes of football, averaging a point every 50.3 seconds.  For the first time in the 1904 season, Heston did not score.

Michigan 28, Wisconsin 0
Michigan played its first full-length game (two 35-minute halves) of the season against Wisconsin. Michigan won the game, 28–0. Heston and Carter each scored two touchdowns, and Norcross added another.

Michigan 36, Drake 4
In its ninth game, Michigan defeated the team from Drake by a score of 36–4. The game was played in two 25-minute halves. Curtis led the scoring with 16 points on two touchdowns and six extra point kicks. Willie Heston did not play in the game.

Michigan 22, Chicago 12
Michigan concluded an undefeated season with a 22–12 win over the University of Chicago on November 12. The game, played in 35-minute halves, featured several College Football Hall of Fame inductees, including Walter Eckersall and Hugo Bezdek for Chicago and Willie Heston and Germany Schulz for Michigan. Heston, Eckersall and Bezdek each scored single touchdowns, but the lead scorer was Michigan's Tom Hammond with 17 points on three touchdowns and two extra points.  Heston finished the season with 20 touchdowns for 100 points.

Players

Varsity letter winners
The following 13 players received varsity "M" letters for their participation on the 1904 football team:

Scoring leaders

Reserves
Charles W. Anderson, Albion, Michigan
Harry S. Bartlett, Detroit, Michigan
Walter Cooley Becker, Chicago, Illinois
Roy Beechler, Ithaca, New York - started 1 game at right tackle
James DePree, Holland, Michigan
Robert M. Drysdale, Wooster, Ohio
George Palmer Edmonds, Wayne, Michigan
John Garrels, left end, Detroit, Michigan - started 6 games at left end
Edward P. "Ted" Hammond, Detroit, Michigan - started 2 games at center
John F. Lewis, Covington, Indiana
Jay Mack Love, Arkansas City, Kansas
Paul Magoffin, Washington, D.C. - started 3 games at right halfback
William Joseph Miller, Escanaba, Michigan
Harry E. Patrick, Detroit, Michigan - started 1 game at left halfback
Duncan H. Pierce, Buffalo, New York
Walter Rheinschild, Los Angeles, California
Mason Rumney, Detroit, Michigan
Reuben S. Schmidt, Los Angeles, California
Charles Smoyer, Wadsworth, Ohio
Edward G. Weeks, Allegan, Michigan
Harry A. Workman, Chicago, Illinois

Others
Charles A. Briggs, Red Oak, Iowa
William Cole, Charlottesville, Virginia
Roswell Murray Wendell, Detroit, Michigan

Awards and honors
 Captain: Willie Heston
 All-Americans: Willie Heston (as selected by Walter Camp, New York Evening Telegram, and Fred Lowenthal); Joe Curtis (as selected by Fred Lowenthal)
 All-Western: Willie Heston (Chicago Record-Herald, Chicago Tribune, Detroit Free Press, Detroit Tribune), Tom Hammond (Chicago Record-Herald, Chicago Tribune, Detroit Free Press), Frank Longman (Chicago Record-Herald, Detroit Free Press, Detroit Tribune), Joe Curtis (Chicago Record-Herald, Chicago Tribune, Detroit Tribune), Carter (Detroit Tribune)

Coaching staff
 Head coach: Fielding H. Yost
 Assistant coach: William C. "King" Cole
 Trainer: Keene Fitzpatrick
 Graduate director of athletics: Charles A. Baird
 Manager: A.H. Montgomery

References

External links
 1904 Football Team -- Bentley Historical Library, University of Michigan Athletics History
 Michigan Alumnus, 1904–1905 - includes accounts of each game
 1905 Michiganensian - University of Michigan yearbook for the 1904–1905 academic year

Michigan
Michigan Wolverines football seasons
College football national champions
Big Ten Conference football champion seasons
College football undefeated seasons
Michigan Wolverines football